"I Will Be Here for You" is a 1992 single written by Diane Warren and Michael W. Smith and performed by Smith.  The single was a track from his album Change Your World, and was a hit on the Adult Contemporary chart, reaching No. 1 for two weeks and also peaking at No. 27 on the U.S. Billboard Hot 100. On Cash Box, the song peaked at No. 24.

Charts

Weekly charts

Year-end charts

Personnel 
 Michael W. Smith – lead vocals, keyboards
 Mike Lawler – additional keyboards 
 Dann Huff – guitars
 Gary Lunn – bass 
 Mark Hammond – drum programming
 Terry McMillan – percussion
 Barry Green – trombone
 Chris McDonald – trombone, horn arrangements
 Mike Haynes – trumpet 
 George Tidwell – trumpet
 The Nashville String Machine – strings
 Ronn Huff – string arrangements
 Carl Gorodetsky – concertmaster
 Michael Black – backing vocals
 Chris Harris – backing vocals
 Mark Heimmerman – backing vocals 
 Wayne Kirkpatrick – backing vocals

References

External links
 

1992 singles
Pop ballads
Rock ballads
Songs written by Diane Warren
Songs written by Michael W. Smith
Michael W. Smith songs
Reunion Records singles
1992 songs